Livingston Tallmadge Merchant (November 23, 1903 – May 15, 1976) was a United States official and diplomat.  He twice served as United States ambassador to Canada and was Under Secretary for Political Affairs from 1959 to 1961.

Early life
Merchant, who was nicknamed "Livy," was born in New York City on November 23, 1903. He was the son of Huntington Wolcott Merchant (c.1870–1918) and Mary Cornelia (née Tallmadge) Merchant, who lived at 1172 Park Avenue in New York City.  His sister was Elizabeth Wolcott "Betty" Merchant (b. 1902), who married Philip Gallatin Cammann.

He was a descendant on his father's side of Oliver Wolcott Jr., the second Secretary of the Treasury under George Washington following Alexander Hamilton.  Through his mother, he was descended from Sir Thomas Tallmadge, who emigrated to the colonies in 1632, Benjamin Tallmadge, and Gen. William Floyd, a signer of the Declaration of Independence. His maternal grandparents were Chester Livingston Tallmadge and Fanny Amelia Hamilton.

Merchant was educated at the Hotchkiss School in 1922, where his classmates included Charles W. Yost and Paul Nitze, and Princeton in 1926, where he was a member of the University Cottage Club and the Board of Trustees of Princeton University.

Career
He joined Scudder Stevens and Clark, an investment counselling firm.  He became a general partner in 1930.

Following his successful business career, Merchant joined the Government in 1942 following the attack on Pearl Harbor and moved up in the U.S. Department of State during the height of the Cold War.  In 1949, when the Chiang Kai-shek regime collapsed, Merchant was in Nanking, China to assist. In the early 1950s, he served as Deputy Assistant Secretary of State for Far Eastern Affairs (under Dean Rusk who served as Assistant Secretary for Far Eastern Affairs and Dean Acheson, then US Secretary of State) in the Truman administration.  He was twice appointed as Assistant Secretary of State for European Affairs. In 1959, he was appointed Under Secretary of State for Political Affairs, succeeding his former boss, Robert Daniel Murphy.

He was appointed U.S. Ambassador to Canada under Presidents Dwight D. Eisenhower and John F. Kennedy.  In 1961, while Ambassador, President Kennedy appointed Merchant as his personal representative to negotiate the border dispute between Afghanistan and Pakistan.

Merchant served as Acting Secretary of State in January, 1961. 

In 1964, he co-authored the Merchant-Heeney Report which examined bilateral relations between Canada and the United States. In his obituary in The New York Times, Merchant was described by the late Secretary of State John Foster Dulles and the late President Eisenhower as "the ideal of a Foreign Service officer."

Later work
In 1963, he was a director of the Glen Falls Insurance Company. From August 11, 1965 to October 31, 1968, he was executive director of the International Bank for Reconstruction and Development. Also in 1968, he was awarded an honorary doctorate by Harvard University that cited "in a long career, this discerning diplomat has advanced the interests of our country with faithfulness and distinction."

Personal life
On December 11, 1927, Merchant was married to Elizabeth Stiles (b. 1904) at the Bethlehem Chapel at the Washington National Cathedral. She was the daughter of Dr. Charles Wardell Stiles and Virginia Baker Stiles and the granddaughter of Lewis Baker, who served as President of the West Virginia Senate, and U.S. Ambassador to Nicaragua, Costa Rica and El Salvador. Together, they were the parents of a son and two daughters:

 Rev. Livingston T. Merchant Jr.
 Elizabeth Gerard Merchant, who married Charles R. Leutz. They divorced and she married William Tyson, grandson of George Tyson, former president of the Burlington and Missouri Railroad, in 1956
 Mary Gerard Merchant, a Bryn Mawr College graduate who married Robert Wrenn Jasperson (1928–2005), the former executive director of Conservation Law Society and the general counsel of Save the Redwoods League. They divorced and she remarried to Harry Jack Sturgeon (1931–2010).

Merchant died of heart failure in Washington, DC on May 15, 1976. He was buried at Rock Creek Cemetery in Washington.

Descendants
Through his daughter Mary, he was the grandfather of Robert Merchant Jasperson and Leslie Wrenn Jasperson Tesei.

References

External links 
Livingston T. Merchant Papers at Seeley G. Mudd Library, Princeton University

1903 births
1976 deaths
20th-century American diplomats
Acting United States Secretaries of State
People from Manhattan
Hotchkiss School alumni
Princeton University alumni
Ambassadors of the United States to Canada
United States Career Ambassadors
Under Secretaries of State for Political Affairs
United States Assistant Secretaries of State
United States Foreign Service personnel